Blackfield is the debut album by the art rock band Blackfield, released on the Snapper Music/Helicon labels in February 2004. The album was re-released in August of the same year with an additional three-track bonus disc, followed by a later pressing that contains the album and the three bonus tracks all on one CD.

Two songs are covers in English of earlier Aviv Geffen songs in Hebrew, "Cloudy Now" from 1993 and "Scars" from 2000. In the latter case, Aviv's original studio recording was simply reused with newly sung vocals.

Four singles were released from the album: "Hello", "Pain", "Blackfield" and "Cloudy Now".

Track listing

Bonus disc 

There is also a 2-LP version with "Perfect World" and another, LP-exclusive track, "Feel So Low"; the latter is a cover of a Porcupine Tree song from Lightbulb Sun with the first verse sung in Hebrew.

Steven Wilson's SoundCloud page features an extended version of the title-track as a streamable and downloadable WAV file. This version has an extra minute and a half at the end, where the outro groove turns into acoustic guitar strumming and a new vocal line before the song fades out.

Personnel 

Blackfield
 Aviv Geffen - keyboards, additional guitars, vocals
 Steven Wilson - guitars, additional keyboards, vocals
 Daniel Salomon - piano; keyboards and backing vocals on "Cloudy Now (live)"
 Seffy Efrati - bass guitar
 Chris Maitland - drums, percussion on "Blackfield", "The Hole in Me", "Hello" and "Cloudy Now (live)", backing vocals on "Cloudy Now (live)"

Guest musicians
 Gavin Harrison - drums, percussion on "Open Mind", "Pain" and "Perfect World"
 Yirmi Kaplan - drums, percussion on "Glow" and "Summer"
 The Mistakes - instruments on "Scars"
 Strings on "Open Mind", "Lullaby", "Summer" and "Hello" performed by the Illusion quartet conducted by Daniel Salomon.

Production
 Steven Wilson – producer, mixer
 Aviv Geffen - producer
 Shlomy Kane'an, Barack Gabison, Eyal Dafna - technical assistance
 Chris Blair – mastering
 Lasse Hoile – photography
 Carl Glover – graphic design

References 

Blackfield albums
2004 debut albums
Helicon Records albums
Snapper Music albums